The 1848 United States presidential election in Michigan took place on November 7, 1848, as part of the 1848 United States presidential election. Voters chose five representatives, or electors to the Electoral College, who voted for President and Vice President.

Michigan voted for the Democratic candidate, Lewis Cass, over Whig candidate Zachary Taylor and Free Soil candidate Martin Van Buren. Cass won his home state, for which he was serving as a United States Senator, by a margin of 10.44%. This was the last time until 1968 that a Democrat would carry Michigan without winning the presidency.

Results

See also
 United States presidential elections in Michigan

References

Michigan
1848
1848 Michigan elections